The 2000 R League was the second season of the R League. Anyang LG Cheetahs won their first national title after defeating Seongnam Ilhwa Chunma in the Championship final.

Central League

Southern League

Championship playoffs

Bracket

Semi-finals

Final

See also
2000 in South Korean football

References

External links
2000 R League at Soccer World 

R League seasons
2000 in South Korean football